Burnsville Township, population 1,942, is one of eight townships in Anson County, North Carolina. This township does not have any cities or towns within it.

Geography
Burnsville Township is bounded by the Rocky River on the north and Lanes Creek on the east.  Two tributaries to the Rocky River are in Burnsville Township and include Cribs Creek and Richardson Creek.

References

Townships in Anson County, North Carolina
Townships in North Carolina